The Metropolis Performing Arts Centre is a professional theatre company in Arlington Heights, Illinois, founded in 2000.  They often have over 300 performances of more than 40 different productions with over 70,000 patrons each season.

List of Shows
(This is an incomplete list. You can help Wikipedia by expanding it.)
2004-2005
 "Vagina Monologues"
 "Defending the Caveman"
 " Odd Couple"
 "A Midsummer Night's Dream"
 "Forever Plaid"

2005-2006
 " Beyond Therapy"
 "Steel Magnolias"
 "Run For Your Wife"
 "Brighton Beach Memoirs"
 "The Nerd"

2006-2007
 "I Love You, You're Perfect. Now Change"
 "Barefoot in the Park"
 "A Streetcar Named Desire"
 "Don't Dress for Dinner"

2007-2008
 "High School Musical"
 "Deathtrap"
 "Sylvia"
 "The Musical of Musicals the Musical"

2008-2009
 "Damn Yankees"
 "The Foreignor"
 "Lend Me A Tenor"
 "Baby"

2009-2010
 "Pump Boys and Dinettes"
 "Out of Order"
 " Side Man"
 "Midlife the Crisis Musical"
 
2010-2011
 "The 25th Annual Putnam County Spelling Bee"
 "The Boys Next Door"
 "The Butler Didn't"
 "Nunsense"

2011-2012
 "Married Alive!"
 "The Andrews Brothers"
 The Complete History of America (Abridged)
 10 Ways To Kill Your Husband

2012-2013
 The Marvelous Wonderettes
 A Christmas Carol
 There's a Girl in My Soup
 Accomplice
 Five Course Love

2013-2014
 Route 66
 The Last Five Years
 A Christmas Carol
 Greater Tuna
 Half and Half

2014-2015
 Laughter on the 23rd Floor
 Dial M for Murder
 A Christmas Carol
 Private Lives
 An Evening with C.S. Lewis
 Drowsy Chaperone

2015-2016
 Moon Over Buffalo
 Spamalot
 A Christmas Carol
 The 39 Steps
 Rent (musical)
 Ring of Fire
2016-2017

 Young Frankenstein 
 Rosencrantz and Guildenstern are Dead
 Hair
 Peter and the Starcatcher

2017-2018

 Into the Woods
 Boeing Boeing
 Avenue Q
 Beehive: The 60's Musical

2018-2019

 A Chorus Line 
 The Mousetrap
 A Funny Thing Happened on the Way to the Forum  
 Buddy: The Buddy Holly Story 
2019-2020

 Anything Goes
 Noises Off
 Baskerville: A Sherlock Holmes Mystery (virtual)
2021-2022

 Little Shop of Horrors
 My Way: A Musical Tribute to Frank Sinatra
 Legally Blonde
 A Christmas Carol
 Lady Day at Emerson’s Bar and Grill
 SHOUT! The Mod Musical
 Sister Act

References

External links
 

Regional theatre in the United States
Theatrical organizations in the United States
Arts organizations based in Illinois
Arlington Heights, Illinois
Arts organizations established in 2000
2000 establishments in Illinois